Marquand Alexander Manuel (born July 11, 1979) is an American football coach and former safety who is the safeties coach for the New York Jets of the National Football League (NFL). He previously served as the defensive coordinator for the Atlanta Falcons and as an assistant coach for the Seattle Seahawks. After playing college football for the University of Florida, he was selected in the sixth round of the 2002 NFL Draft. He played for eight seasons in the NFL for the Seattle Seahawks, Green Bay Packers, Carolina Panthers, Denver Broncos, and Detroit Lions. He was the defensive coordinator for the Atlanta Falcons from 2017 to 2018.

Playing career

Early years

Manuel was born in Miami, Florida in 1979.  He attended Miami Senior High School, and he played high school football for the Miami High Stingarees.  As a senior safety in 1996, Manuel was a Florida Class 6A all-state selection who made ninety-six tackles, nine interceptions and eight blocked passes.  He received high school All-America recognition from National Recruiting Advisor, PrepStar and SuperPrep, and was rated among the top defensive back prospects in the country.  Manuel was also a four-year honor roll student, and ran the 100-meter dash in 10.6 seconds for the Miami Stingarees track team.

Manuel accepted an athletic scholarship to attend the University of Florida in Gainesville, Florida, where he played for coach Steve Spurrier's Florida Gators football team from 1998 to 2001.  The Gators coaching staff decided to red-shirt him as a true freshman in 1997, but he played in all eleven regular season games in 1998.  As a sophomore in 1999, he totaled 118 tackles, three interceptions, two sacks, one forced fumble and four passes defensed as a sophomore.  He started two games at outside linebacker, in addition to seeing significant action at safety, and led the team in tackles.

As a junior in 2000, Manuel served as a key leader on Florida's 10–2 Southeastern Conference (SEC) championship team that earned a berth in the Sugar Bowl.  As a senior team captain in 2001, he helped lead the Gators to a 10–2 record, a 56–23 victory over the Maryland Terrapins in the Orange Bowl, and a final No. 3 ranking in both major polls.  He played in forty-six games during his collegiate career, and totaled 308 tackles, eight quarterback sacks, nine tackles for a loss, six fumble recoveries, twenty-two passes defensed and six interceptions.

Manuel was a four-year SEC Academic Honor Roll honoree.  He earned a bachelor's degree in criminal justice from the University of Florida in December 2000, and finished his college football career as a graduate student working toward a master's degree in education counseling with a special emphasis on mental health.

National Football League

Cincinnati Bengals

Manuel made his NFL debut against the Cleveland Browns on September 15, 2002, and started for the first time against the Indianapolis Colts and had two tackles. During the 2003 season, Manuel totaled eight tackles (six solo) in thirteen games with one start for the Bengals, and he also added five tackles on special teams. Manuel was waived by Cincinnati on September 5, 2004.

Seattle Seahawks

Manuel was claimed off waivers by the Seattle Seahawks on September 6, 2004. In , Manuel was part of the Seahawks team that finished 13–3. In the 2005 NFC Championship Game against the Carolina Panthers, he returned an interception thirty-two yards to set up a touchdown. The Seahawks reached Super Bowl XL, but lost to the Pittsburgh Steelers 21–10. Manuel started the Super Bowl at free safety, but injured his hip in the second quarter, and was replaced by Etric Pruitt.

Green Bay Packers
After Seattle's appearance in the Super Bowl, he was signed by the Green Bay Packers as an unrestricted free agent on March 13, 2006. Memorably, he intercepted a pass deflected by Ahmad Carroll and returned it twenty-nine yards for a touchdown against the Detroit Lions on September 24.

Carolina Panthers

The Green Bay Packers released Manuel on September 1, 2007 during the final preseason roster cuts, and he was signed by the Carolina Panthers on September 3.  He played for the Panthers for a single season during , playing in sixteen games and starting in two of them.

Denver Broncos

He played in all sixteen regular season games for the Broncos, starting in fourteen of them, and tallying eighty-three tackles and four blocked passes.

Detroit Lions

He played in nine games for the Lions, starting in six of them, and compiling thirty-six tackles. The Lions released him on August 4, 2010, during the 2010 preseason.

During his eight seasons in the NFL, Manuel played in 116 games, starting in fifty-seven of them, and compiled 366 tackles; he also had fifteen blocked passes, two interceptions and four forced fumbles.

Coaching career

Seattle Seahawks
On February 14, 2012, the Seattle Seahawks announced that the team had hired Manuel to serve as Seahawks' assistant special teams coach.  A year later he was named defensive assistant. where he helped the Seahawks with Super Bowl XLVIII. In 2014 he was promoted to assistant secondaries coach, helping the Seahawks reach Super Bowl XLIX, where they lost to the New England Patriots.

Atlanta Falcons
Manuel was hired by the Atlanta Falcons in 2015 as the defensive backs coach, following Dan Quinn from Seattle to Atlanta. After coming under fire for it, 
During the 2016 offseason, Manuel interviewed for the Jacksonville Jaguars defensive coordinator position, though he did not get the job. In the 2016 season, Manuel and the Falcons reached Super Bowl LI, where they lost to the New England Patriots on February 5, 2017.

On February 10, 2017, Manuel was promoted to defensive coordinator of the Falcons.

Manuel let his contract expire with the Atlanta Falcons after the 2018 season in which the team finished with a 7–9 record.

Philadelphia Eagles
Manuel was hired by the Philadelphia Eagles as their defensive backs coach on February 5, 2020.

Personal life

He established the Marquand Manuel Foundation to help kids in his hometown of Miami.  His oldest brother, John, was a Parade magazine All-American and played football at University of Florida.  Marquand is the ninth of nineteen children and has a family of siblings whose ages differ by 25 years from oldest to youngest.  Manuel has a daughter, Madison age 15 and son Marquand Manuel II age 11.

See also 

 Florida Gators football, 1990–99
 List of Carolina Panthers players
 List of Detroit Lions players
 List of Florida Gators in the NFL Draft
 List of Green Bay Packers players
 List of University of Florida alumni

References

Bibliography 

 Carlson, Norm, University of Florida Football Vault: The History of the Florida Gators, Whitman Publishing, LLC, Atlanta, Georgia (2007).  .
 Golenbock, Peter, Go Gators!  An Oral History of Florida's Pursuit of Gridiron Glory, Legends Publishing, LLC, St. Petersburg, Florida (2002).  .
 Hairston, Jack, Tales from the Gator Swamp: A Collection of the Greatest Gator Stories Ever Told, Sports Publishing, LLC, Champaign, Illinois (2002).  .
 McCarthy, Kevin M.,  Fightin' Gators: A History of University of Florida Football, Arcadia Publishing, Mount Pleasant, South Carolina (2000).  .

1979 births
Living people
American football safeties
Carolina Panthers players
Cincinnati Bengals players
Denver Broncos players
Detroit Lions players
Florida Gators football players
Florida Gators men's track and field athletes
Green Bay Packers players
Players of American football from Miami
Seattle Seahawks coaches
Seattle Seahawks players
Miami Senior High School alumni
National Football League defensive coordinators
Atlanta Falcons coaches
Philadelphia Eagles coaches
Sports coaches from Miami
New York Jets coaches
Ed Block Courage Award recipients